David Edward John Frith (born 16 March 1937) is a cricket writer and historian. Cricinfo describes him as "an author, historian, and founding editor of Wisden Cricket Monthly".

Life and career
David Frith was born in Gloucester Terrace in London, not far from Lord's, on 16 March 1937. 

The family resided in Rayners Lane, Harrow, whilst he attended Roxbourne School. In 1949 he emigrated with his family to Australia, arriving in Sydney aboard the RMS Orion on 25 February 1949.

After leaving Canterbury Boys' High School on 15 February 1954 he started his first job as a copy-boy for The Daily Mirror but left after two months to join the Commonwealth Bank where he was posted to the Cronulla branch. He played his early cricket for the famous St George club and then Paddington before returning to England in 1964.

Return to Sydney
After the death of his mother in May 1971, family commitments led Frith to move back to Sydney. Here he sought, to no avail, a full-time cricket related post but, thanks to a recommendation by Jack Fingleton, he did secure some work with the Australian News and Information Bureau. The return to Australia would prove to be short-lived and he moved back to the United Kingdom departing aboard the TSS Fairstar on 19 March 1972.

Magazine editing
Commencing with the November 1972 issue, he succeeded Tony Pawson as deputy editor of The Cricketer before becoming editor from the March 1973 issue. He founded Wisden Cricket Monthly and edited it from June 1979 to February 1996. In 1988 Frith won the Sports Council's British Sports Journalism award as Magazine Sports Writer of the Year.

Specialising in Ashes Test match history, Frith has written dozens of books on both cricket in modern times and cricket of the past. His major works include My Dear Victorious Stod (a biography of A. E. Stoddart), a lavishly illustrated history of England versus Australia, Silence of the Heart (on cricket's suicides, an expansion of his earlier book By His Own Hand), The Fast Men, The Slow Men (about fast bowlers and spinners respectively), Pageant of Cricket (the only cricket book to have as many as 2000 pictures), Caught England, Bowled Australia (autobiography), The Trailblazers (the first English tour of Australia, in 1861–62), The Archie Jackson Story (biography) and Bodyline Autopsy. The catalogue of his vast collection ran to 1100 pages. He has also been involved in producing cricket videos, which have been extremely successful.

Frith famously commented that India should withdraw from the World Cup if they didn't improve.  When they won it in 1983 he was pleased to (literally) eat his words, with the help of some red wine, claiming that he had helped spur India to victory.

In association with the National Film and Television Archive, he presented an annual archive cricket film evening at the National Film Theatre in London for 30 years.

In 2003 Frith became the first author to win the Cricket Society's Book of the Year award three times, and was also a finalist in the William Hill Sports Book awards for his Bodyline Autopsy. The book also won Wisden's book of the year and, in January 2010, it won Cricketweb's award for "book of the decade". In his assessment, Martin Chandler wrote:

"Autopsy" is a magnificent book possessing a vibrancy and objectivity that when I first read it I found quite remarkable. It is, without question, the CW "Book of the Decade" and were there any prospect of my being around to collect I would certainly place a large wager on whoever is writing this feature in 90 years time confirming it as CW "Book of the Century".

His co-written history of the Australian Cricket Board won the Australian Cricket Society book award in 2007, and in 2011 Frith was given the Cricket Society's Ian Jackson Award for Distinguished Services to Cricket.

He has been honorary vice-president of the Cricket Memorabilia Society since its foundation in 1987.

In 2013 he was awarded honorary life membership of the Association of Cricket Statisticians and Historians, and wrote a further book, Guildford's Cricket Story, which revealed his adopted home town's unique claims to being the 'cradle of cricket'.

Books by Frith

 
 
 
 
 
 
 
 
 
 
 
 
 
 
 
 
 
 
 
 
 
 
 
 
2011: Random House,

References

External links

1937 births
Living people
Cricket historians and writers
British male journalists
Writers from London
People educated at Canterbury Boys' High School